The 2019-20 Kategoria e Dytë was the 48th official season of the Albanian football third division since its establishment. There were 26 teams competing this season, split in 2 groups. The winners of the groups played the league's final against each other and also gained promotion to the 2020–21 Kategoria e Parë. Teams ranked from the 2nd to the 5th position qualified to the play-off round which they played against the 8th ranked teams in the 2019-20 Kategoria e Parë. Partizani B, Tomori and Vora were promoted to the 2020–21 Kategoria e Parë. Vora won their second Kategoria e Dytë title after beating Tomori in the final match. The competition was completely suspended from 12 March to 7 June 2020, due to the Covid-19 Pandemic.

Changes from last season

Team changes

From Second Division
Promoted to Kategoria e Parë:
 Devolli
 Shkumbini
 Tërbuni

To Second Division
Expelled from Kategoria Superiore:
 Kamza

Relegated from Kategoria e Parë:
 Tomori
 Vora

Promoted from Kategoria e Tretë:
 Mirdita
 Selenica

Locations

Stadia by capacity and locations

Group A

Group B

League standings

Group A

Results

Group B

Results

Final

Group A Promotion play-offs
<onlyinclude>

Semi-finals

Final

Partizani B qualified to the final play-off match.

Group B Promotion play-offs
<onlyinclude>

Semi-finals

Final

Maliqi qualified to the final play-off match.

References

3
2019–20 in European third tier association football leagues
Kategoria e Dytë seasons